Bob Skelton may refer to:

 Bob Skelton (jockey) (1934–2016), jockey in New Zealand and Australian Thoroughbred horse racing
 Bob Skelton (swimmer) (1903–1977), American swimmer
 Bob Skelton (racing driver)